Chacha Chaudhary is an Indian Children's television series based on the popular Indian comic book character Chacha Chaudhary, created by cartoonist Pran Kumar Sharma. The series stars known Indian television actor Raghubir Yadav as Chacha Chaudhary.

Cast
 Raghubir Yadav as Chacha Chaudhary
 Praveen Kumar Sobti / Jitendra Singh as Sabu
 Madhuri Sanjeev as Chachi
 Zahida Parveen as Jadugarni Sheeba
 Shahab Khan in various characters
 Kavi Kumar Azad in various characters
 Simple Kaul in various characters

References

Indian children's television series
2002 Indian television series debuts
Television shows based on comics
Sahara One original programming